Calidonia is a corregimiento within Panama City, in Panamá District, Panamá Province, Panama with a population of 19,108 as of 2010. Its population as of 1990 was 23,974; its population as of 2000 was 19,729. Calidonia is known for it's once having a large population of immigrants from the British Caribbean islands. The population of British Caribbean descent has declined but many remain as do some of their businesses.

References

Corregimientos of Panamá Province
Panamá District